Kuparinen is a Finnish surname. Notable people with the surname include:

 Eeki Kuparinen (born 1991), Finnish Grand Prix motorcycle racer
 Matti Kuparinen (born 1984), Finnish professional ice hockey forward 
 Tuomas Kuparinen (born 1979), Finnish football player 

Finnish-language surnames